In May and June 2018, a spree killer sought out and fatally shot six people in Scottsdale, Arizona, United States. The shooting spree began on May 30 and ended June 4, when the shooter killed himself as police closed in. The shooter was identified as 56-year-old Dwight Lamon Jones.

Shootings
The victims of the initial shootings were a noted forensic psychiatrist, two paralegals, and a counselor; all were shot within 24 hours of each other and within a  radius in Scottsdale and Phoenix. The other two victims were discovered June 4.

Fifty-nine year old Steven Pitt, a well-known forensic psychiatrist, was shot and killed outside his office at 5:20 pm on Thursday, May 31. Pitt had examined Jones in connection with a "bitter" divorce.  In 2006 Pitt helped the police identify the Baseline killer who had raped and murdered a series of women in Phoenix, Arizona.

Forty-eight year old Veleria Sharp and forty-nine year old Laura Anderson, paralegals, were shot and killed at 2:15 pm on Friday, June 1 in the downtown Scottsdale offices of Burt, Feldman, Grenier, the law firm where they worked.  A lawyer at the firm had worked on the Jones divorce. By 11:30 pm on Friday, June 1, police knew that the same gun had been used to kill Anderson, Sharp and Pitt.

The body of 72-year old Marshall Levine, a psychologist and counselor, was found just after midnight, as Friday turned to Saturday, June 2, in his Scottsdale office.  Levine  was subletting his office from a woman who had provided counseling services to his son during the divorce, Jones' intended target.

By Sunday afternoon, police had Jones under surveillance as he drove around Fountain Hills in his gold Mercedes Benz.  At one point, Jones ditched a small bag containing a .22-caliber pistol, which police later determined to belong to one of two people, 70-year-old Mary Simmons and 72-year-old Bryon Thomas, who were shot and killed inside a Fountain Hills home.  Their bodies were not discovered until Monday, June 4.  Police stated that ballistics ruled out the 22-caliber gun from having been used in any of the shootings.

Investigation
The break in the investigation came when Jones' ex-wife issued a statement saying her current husband, a retired Phoenix police detective, "recognized the connection to my divorce and the three crime scenes and he notified the Phoenix Police violent crime unit on Saturday (June 2) night." Once Jones was made a suspect, a DNA sample was obtained from a relative of Jones and matched to a DNA sample from a recovered shell casing.

Perpetrator

The perpetrator was identified as 56-year-old Dwight Lamon Jones who had previously been arrested. According to Rich Slavin, an assistant chief with the Scottsdale Police Department, Jones was arrested in 2008 or 2009 on charges of domestic violence, alleging that he mistreated his wife and a child. Jones had been living at Extended Stay hotels for the past nine years. He committed suicide before he was apprehended.

His former wife told reporters that she "feared for my safety for the past nine years." In her statement she continued with "He was a very emotionally disturbed person as the court records will confirm." Less than a week before the spree killings Jones used social media to attempt to bring forward allegations that his ex-wife was the abuser and not Jones. Jones created almost 10 hours of content outlining what he viewed as a conspiracy by his ex-wife, psychiatrists, lawyers and the Maricopa County Judicial system to rig a divorce and custody case to steal his son from him.

References

2018 in Arizona
2018 mass shootings in the United States
2018 murders in the United States
Deaths by firearm in Arizona
History of Scottsdale, Arizona
June 2018 crimes in the United States
Mass shootings in Arizona
May 2018 crimes in the United States
Murder in Arizona
Spree shootings in the United States
Mass shootings in the United States
Attacks in the United States in 2018